Bigg Boss (or colloquially Bigg Boss Bangla) was the Bengali-language version of the reality TV programme Bigg Boss broadcast in India. It follows the Big Brother format, which was first developed by Endemol in the Netherlands. The show had completed 2 seasons in 4 years. The first season launched on 17 June 2013 and second season was launched on 4 April 2016. However the show has been discontinued after season 2 but a leading Bengali TV channel is planning to launch its new season and discussion about copyright issues is still on and show makers are yet to finalise it.

Bigg Boss Season 1 was telecasted by ETV Bangla Channel hosted by Mithun Chakraborty and the second season was telecast by Colors Bangla which was rebranded channel of ETV Bangla and season 2 was hosted by Jeet.

Overview

Concept
Bigg Boss Bangla is a reality show based on the Hindi show Bigg Boss which too was based on the original Dutch Big Brother format developed by John de Mol. A number of contestants (known as "housemates") live in a purpose-built house and are isolated from the rest of the world. Each week, housemates nominate two of their peers for eviction, and the housemates who receives the most nominations would face a public vote. Of these, one would eventually leave, having been "evicted" from the House. However, there were exceptions to this process as dictated by Bigg Boss Bangla. In the final week, there were three housemates remaining, and the public voted for who they wanted to win. The housemates in the Bengali version are primarily celebrities.

The House 

The Bigg Boss House is located in the tourist center of Lonavala, Pune district of Maharashtra. It is well furnished and decorated. It has all kinds of modern amenities, one king size bedroom and one royal bath room. There is a garden, pool, activity area and gym in the House. There is also a Confession Room, where the housemates may be called in by Bigg Boss for any kind of conversation, and for the nomination process.
The House has no TV connection, no phones, no Internet connection, clocks, pen or paper.

Rules 

While all the rules have never been told to the audience, the most prominent ones are clearly seen. The inmates are not permitted to talk in any other language except Bengali. They always have to wear the lapel. They cannot leave the House premises at any time unless they are evicted or decided by Bigg Boss. They can discuss the nomination process with anyone. They are not allowed to sleep without the permission of Bigg Boss.

The 'Eye' Logo 

Each season gets its own Bigg Boss 'Eye' logo similar to the Bigg Boss and Big Brother shows. The first season of Bangla Bigg Boss on ETV Bangla inherited its logo from the sixth season of its Hindi counterpart in the form of a human eye with an eyeball displaying the SMPTE color bars, against a purple, lightning storm background. The second season, got its dedicated logo in the form of a more detailed human eye against a background of purple tornado. This logo also had the text 'Season 2' below the 'Eye' and the tagline for the second season was 'Byata Dumukho'.

Series details

 | Link3.   = Bigg boss(Bangla season 3)

Housemate pattern

See also 
 Big Brother (UK)
 Celebrity Big Brother 5 (UK) – Controversial series of the UK's Celebrity Big Brother involving Season 2 host Shilpa Shetty and Season 2 Housemate Jade Goody.
 Jade Goody – Appeared on the same UK version of Celebrity Big Brother with Season 2 presenter Shilpa Shetty, later to become a Season 2 Housemate.
 Bigg Boss, the pan Indian series aired in seven regional-languages which follows the same format.
 Rojgere Ginni

References

External links 
 

Indian reality television series
Indian game shows
2013 Indian television series debuts
Indian television series based on non-Indian television series
Colors Bangla original programming
Bengali-language television programming in India